For the 1942 Vuelta a España, the field consisted of 40 riders; 18 finished the race.

References

1942 Vuelta a España
1942